Mohamed Henedi Ahmed Abdel Gawad is an Egyptian comedian actor born in Giza, Egypt, on 1 February 1965, and has gained a cinematic bachelor's degree. Henedi started his career in 1991 in short appearances in theaters and cinemas, and he achieved huge success in his two films Esma'eleya Rayeh Gaii and Sa'ede Fel Gam'a Al Amrekya. He later starred in the movies Hamam fi Amsterdam, Belya we Demagho el Alya, Saheb Sahbo and Andaleeb Al Dokki. Mohamed Henedi also dubbed the voices of Timon, Mike Wazowski and Homer Simpson for the Egyptian versions of The Lion King, Monsters, Inc., and The Simpsons respectively.

Yasmine El-Reshidi of The Wall Street Journal said that Henedi was "considered the Robert De Niro of the Middle East."

Filmography 
Alexandria Again  and Forever (1990)
Amir El Behar (2009) (Amir)
Andaleeb El Dokki (2008)
Antar ibn ibn ibn ibn Shaddad (2017)  (Antar)
Askar fel Moaskar (2003)
Bellyah We Demagho El Alia (2000)
Ga'na El Bian El Taly (2001)
Great Beans of China (2004)
Hamam fi Amsterdam (1999)
Ismailia Rayeh Gai (1997)
Meseu Ramadan Mabrouk (2011) (Mister  Ramadan Mabrouk)
Ramadan Mabrouk Abul-Alamein Hamouda  (2008) (Mister Ramadan Mabrouk)
Sa'eedi Fel Gama'a El Amrekeia  (1998)
Saheb Sahbo (2002)
Samaka Wa Arba't Kuroush (1997)
Sarek Al-Farah (1994)
Taitah Rahibah (2012) (Rauf)
Trust! (2013) (T.V Show)
Wesh Egram (2006)
Ya Ana Ya Khalty (2005)
Yom Morr we Yom Helw (1988)
Zeyaret El-Sayed El-Rais (1994)
Bakhit wa Adeela (1995)

References

External links

Henedy World

Egyptian comedians
1965 births
Living people
Egyptian male film actors
Egyptian male voice actors
People from Giza
Egyptian male television actors
20th-century Egyptian male actors
21st-century Egyptian male actors